Brownsweg is a town and resort  in Suriname in the Brokopondo District. Its population at the 2012 census was 4,793.

History
The town was named after the road that leads to the Brownsberg, and the Brownsberg Nature Park. It is situated near the Brokopondo Reservoir. In 1958 Brownsweg was built for the inhabitants of the area that was flooded after the construction of the Afobaka Dam. One of the main concerns was the transmigration of the 5,000 people living in the area. Bronsweg was a stop at the former Lawa Railway, and in 1959 the Prinses Marijke camp was built near the hamlet.

The resort consists of the villages Wakibasoe 1, 2, 3, Bierhoedoematoe, Kadjoe, Nieuw Ganze, Djankakondre, Makambi, and Nieuw-Koffiekamp. Brownsweg is often used to refer to most villages, because they have grown together, except for Bierhoedoematoe and Nieuw-Koffiekamp which are still detached.

The largest ethnic group of Brownsweg are the Maroons. Most of the inhabitants still live tribally in villages near the rivers and roads. The primary medical care is performed by Medische Zending. The resort can be reached via the Afobakaweg. On 15 May 2020, the Afobakaweg will connect to the Dési Delano Bouterse Highway, the only motorway in Suriname between Paramaribo and Zanderij.

Brownsberg can be reached from the town of Brownsweg. Stoneiland, a tourist resort and beach, is located at the foot of the mountain.

Sports
ACoconut is an association football club in Brownsweg. Bigi Wey Sports Center is a sports venue in Brownsweg.

Notable people
 Diana Pokie (~1979), politician.

References

Further reading
 People in between: the Matawai Maroons of Suriname by Chris de Beet and Miriam Sterman, Digital Library for Dutch Literature, 1981.

Resorts of Suriname
Populated places in Brokopondo District